The fifth election to Dyfed County Council was held in May 1989. It was preceded by the 1985 election and followed by the 1993 election. There were extensive boundary changes at this election.

Overview

The Independents remained the largest party with Labour the nearest challenger.

Ward Results (Cardiganshire)

Aberporth
Minor boundary changes. This ward was largely based on the previous Teifiside No.3 Ward. Dewi Lewis, who previously represented Cardigan, chose to contest Aberporth on this occasion after the siting Liberal member retired.

Aberteifi
The previous Cardigan ward was renamed Aberteifi. The siting member, Dewi Lewis, chose to contest Aberporth instead.

Aberystwyth North
Boundary Change

Aberystwyth South
Boundary Change

Beulah
The ward was previously known as Teifiside No.2

Borth
The ward was previously known as Aberystwyth Rural No. 2

Lampeter

Llanbadarn Fawr
The ward was previously known as Aberystwyth Rural No. 3

Llandysiliogogo
The ward was previously known as Aberaeron No. 3

Llandyfriog
The ward was previously known as Teifiside No.1

Llanfihangel Ystrad
The ward was previously known as Aberaeon No.2

Llansantffraid
The ward was previously known as Aberaeon No.1. Jack Rees, the sitting Independent member, contested the seat for Plaid Cymru but was defeated by the previous member, Evan Williams, reversing the result four years previously.

Lledrod
The ward was previously known as Tregaron.

Ystwyth
The ward was previously known as Aberystwyth Rural No. 1

Ward Results (Carmarthenshire)

Abergwili
The ward was previously known as Carmarthen Rural No. 6.

Ammanford
Boundary Change.

Bigyn
Boundary Change.

Burry Port
Boundary Change.

Carmarthen Town North
The ward was previously known as Carmarthen No. 1

Carmarthen Town South
Boundary Change.

Carmarthen Town West
The ward was previously known as Carmarthen No. 3

Elli
Boundary Change.

Felinfoel

Glanamman
The ward was previously known as Cwmamman.

Glanymor
Boundary Change.

Gorslas
The ward was previously known as Carmarthen Rural No. 1

Hengoed
Hugh Peregrine, who previously represented Pembrey, was returned unopposed for the Hengoed ward after the sitting Independent member stood down.

Kidwelly

Llandovery
The ward was previously known as Llandeilo No. 1

Llandybie
The ward was previously known as Llandeilo No. 5

Llanedi

Llanegwad
The ward was previously known as Llandeilo No. 2

Llanfihangel ar Arth
The ward was previously known as Newcastle Emlyn No. 2.

Llangadog
The ward was previously known as Llandeilo No. 6

Llangeler
The ward was previously known as Newcastle Emlyn No. 1

Llangennech

Llangyndeyrn
Boundary Change.

Llan-non

Llansteffan
The ward was previously known as Carmarthen Rural No. 4.

Lliedi
Boundary Change.

Llwynhendy
Boundary Change.

Pembrey

Pontyberem

Quarter Bach
The ward was previously known as Llandeilo No. 3

Saron
The ward was previously known as Llandeilo No. 4

St Clears
The ward was previously known as Carmarthen Rural No. 5

Tyisha
Boundary Change.

Whitland
The ward was previously known as Carmarthen Rural No. 7. Plaid Cymru won the seat unopposed after the sitting independent member stood down.

Ward Results (Pembrokeshire)

Camrose
Boundary change

Crymych
The ward was previously known as Cemaes No. 2.

East Williamston
Minor boundary change. The ward was previously known as Pembroke Rural No. 2.

Fishguard
Boundary change.

Hakin
The ward was previously known as Milford Haven No. 2

Llangwm
Boundary change.

Milford Central and East
The ward was previously known as Milford Haven No. 1.

Milford North and West
The ward was previously known as Milford Haven No. 3.

Narberth
The ward was previously known as Narberth No. 2.

Neyland
The ward was previously known as Neyland and Llanstadwell.

Pembroke St Mary
The ward was previously known as Pembroke No. 1.

Pembroke St Michael
The ward was previously known as Pembroke Rural No. 1.

Pembroke Dock Llanion
The ward was previously known as Pembroke No. 2

Pembroke Dock Pennar
The ward was previously known as Pembroke No. 3

Portfield
The ward was previously known as Haverfordwest No.1.

Priory
The ward was previously known as Haverfordwest No. 2

Rudbaxton
The ward was previously known as Cemaes No. 3.

St David's
The ward was previously known as Haverfordwest Rural No. 1

St Dogmaels
The ward was previously known as Cemaes No. 1.

Saundersfoot
The ward was previously known as Narberth No. 1.

Tenby

The Havens
Boundary change.

References

1989
1989 Welsh local elections